Nushibi (Nu-shibi, ; Middle Chinese: *nuoXɕiɪt̚piɪt̚) was a Chinese collective name for five tribes of the right (western) wing in the Western Turkic Khaganate, and members of "ten arrows" confederation found in the Chinese literature (十箭 shíjiàn). The references to Nushibi appeared in Chinese sources in 651 and disappeared after 766. The Nushibi tribes occupied the lands of the Western Turkic Kaganate west of the Ili River of contemporary Kazakhstan.

Name's Etymology
Yury Zuev reconstructs Nushibis Middle Chinese pronunciation as nou siet-piet, which, he asserts, transcribes Turkic oŋ šadapït "right wing". Šadapït either means "entourage of the Shad" (Clauson, 1972) or is a title, either cognate with Old Persian *satapati (Bombaci, 1976) "lord of a hundred" or borrowed from Middle Iranian *špādapit < *špād-pad "army lord", compare Pahlavi Spāhbed (Róna-Tas, 2016:70). If true, Nushibi might be identified with the Šadapït mentioned in the Orkhon inscriptions.

Other scholars etymologised Nushibi without Šadapït in mind. János Harmatta reconstructed "Nushibi" as *nu śipiɺ, *nu śipir; and proposed Iranian etymologies, meaning "good horsemen": with *nu "good" (cf. Old Persian *naiba-) and *aśśaβâra, *aśva-bâra, or *aśśaβârya (cf. Saka aśśa "horse", Old Indic bhârya, "soldier, servant"). Nurlan Kenzheakhmet etymologised 弩失畢 (MC: nuǝ-șit-pjit) as Chinese transcription of Sogdian nšypyk (*nišēbīg), nšmy (*nišame), meaning "west".

Ethnic and sartorial characteristics
In the Afrasiab paintings, the Nushibi Western Turks are ethnic Turks, rather than Turkicized Sogdians, as suggested by the marked Mongoloid features and faces without beards. They are the most numerous ethnic group in the mural, and are not ambassadors, but rather military attendants. Their depiction offers a unique glimpse into the costumes of the Turks in the 6-7th century CE. They typically wear 3 or 5 long long plaits, often gathered together into a single long one. They have ankle-long monochromic sleeved coats with two lapels. This fashion for the collar is first seen in Khotan near Turfan, a traditional Turkic land, in the 2nd-4th century CE. They have low black sharp-nosed boots. They wear gold bracelets with lapis lazuli or pearls.

Historical outline

Western Turkic Kaganate

After the split of the First Turkic Khaganate in 604, the Western Turkic Kaganate initially had a three-tribe Nushibi right wing and a five-tribe Duolu left wing. Later on, two Nushibi tribes, Äskäl and Qoshu, reorganized themselves, each subdivided into two tribes, bringing the total numbers to ten, thus the collective name On Oq (Ch. 十箭 "ten arrows"). Both Nushibi and Duolu belonged to the Turkic tribes of the Chuy group, and spoke close dialects.

The transfer of supremacy from the Duolu group to Nushibi had outcome reverberating across Erasian continent. Nushibi controlled, and benefited, from the operation of their section of the transcontinental trade road (Silk Road), and were in alliance with Sogdiana, a chain of small oasis principalities who were also members of the Western Turkic Khaganate, and served as main operators of the Silk Road. Nushibi interest in the Silk Road operation brought them, in addition to the Sogdians, into a coalition with Byzantine and China, two other superpowers interested in the east-west trade. In the west, the coalition included Khazars in the N. Caucasus, and Bulgars in the N. Pontic steppes. This alignment was opposed a coalition of two other powers, Persia and the Eastern Turkic Kaganate, which brought about the first world wars of the 7th century Early Middle Ages.Gumilev L.N., "Ancient Türks", Moscow, 'Science', 1967, Ch. 15 World War of the 7th century,  http://gumilevica.kulichki.net/OT/ot15.htm (In Russian)

Nushibi interests in the Western Turkic Kaganate were advanced by the Kagan Tong Djabgu Qaghan, known from the Armenian annals as "King of the North". The capital was located north of Chach (modern Tashkent) oasis. The period of Nushibi dominance was interrupted in 628 by a joined revolt of Karluks and Doulu tribes, and a consequent death of Tong Jabgu Qaghan from the hands of his uncle. In the interregnum, led by his uncle Külüg Sibir with a title Baghatur Qaghan, the Duolu fraction restored its former dominating position. The coup brought a considerable upshot, in 630 Baghatur-Qaghan had to grant Bulgars their independence and allow them reorganize as what became known as Great Bulgaria. Nushibi opposition to the usurper was headed by Ashina Nishu, a ruler with a seat in Paykend (Paikent), who ruled Bukhara province. Sibir-Khan was killed in 631, and Nushibi installed their choice, son of Tong-djabgu-kagan with a title Irbis Ishbara Sir Jabgu-Qaghan, whose title Sir received the graphically pejorative Chinese transliteration 肆 Sì (< MC */siɪH/) "impudent, undisciplined". Sy Jabghu Khagan was known to western contemporaries as Sinjibu and Silzibul  but soon had to replace him with Ashina Nishu under a name Duolu Qaghan (632–634), probably to appease the northern Duolu tribes. The next succession followed the traditional lateral succession order, a younger brother of Nishu was enthroned with a title Yshbara Tolis-shad (634–639), he enacted a major reform by consenting to the Doulu and Nushibi wings' autonomy and native leadership, not drawn from the Ashina clan. The order, favorable to the Duolu and Nushibi, was hurtful to the Karluks, Yagma, Kipchaks, Basmals, and worst of all to the descendants of the Eastern / Northern Xiongnu – Chuyüe (later Shatuo) and Chumi they were especially anguished because their Chumuhun kins were in the privileged Duolu and Chuban in both Duolo & Nushibi wings.

Independence
In 647 the Western Turkic Kaganate was split into two independent states as a result of Ili River treaty. The independence period lasted until the rise of the Second Turkic Khaganate. In 667 the Nushibi wing of the On oq allied with Tibet. At about 720, a campaign led by Kul Tegin defeated the forces of the Nushibi tribal union led by the Ezgil (Izgil) tribe, and subjugated the former "western wing", which from that time disappeared from the literature. The episode of the military campaign is mentioned in the Bilge Kagan inscription in the Orkhon inscriptions.

Nushibi tribal leaders

Tongdian, Vol. 199 records the five sub-tribes' names and titles of their leaders.

Ethnic and linguistic affiliation
The difference between Nushibi and Duolu groups was solely economical, a consequence of their relative geographical location. Dulu occupied northern portion of the Middle Asia steppes, away from the main artery of the Silk Road, and were little affected by the intracontinental trade. The main source of Duolu trade income came from Turfan of the Turfan basin. Nushibi occupied lands south of Dulu, controlled a major stretch of the caravan road artery and numerous branches, and were profoundly affected by its operation. Bilingual Turkic-Sogdian merchants operated the constellation of oasis city-states with a common name Sogdiana and established a symbiotic relationship with their Nushibi nomadic sponsors. Lev Gumilyov noted that Duolu and Nushibi language was a "djo"-type dialect (djabgu), as opposed to the "yo"-type dialect (y'abgu). The "djo"-type dialects belong to the Kipchak and Siberian Turkic branches of the Turkic language family; in Chuvash, the only extant Oghur dialect, "y-" /j/ becomes occasionally "ś-" /ɕ/.

Orkhon Inscriptions 

Bilge Khagan inscription, 1st side, 14:

Bilge Khagan inscription, 1st side, 15:

Bilge Khagan inscription, 2nd side, 2:

Kül Tegin inscription, 2nd side, 2:

See also

Yueban
Chuyue
Geshu Han

References

Turkic peoples of Asia
Western Turkic Khaganate